The Victorian State League Division 3 is the sixth tier soccer competition (behind the National Premier Leagues) in Victoria, Australia, and the seventh nationally, including the A-League. It is conducted by the Football Federation Victoria, the state's football governing body.

Clubs
The following 24 clubs from 2 conferences of 12 who are competing in the Victorian State League Division 3 during the 2023 season.

State League Division 3 North-west

State League Division 3 South-east

External links
Football Federation Victoria Official website

3